Major General D. K. Addo was a Ghanaian military personnel and a former Chief of Army Staff of the Ghana Army. He served as Chief of Army Staff from August 1969 to June 1971.

References

Ghanaian military personnel
Chiefs of Army Staff (Ghana)